Bathycongrus nasicus is an eel in the family Congridae (conger/garden eels). It was described by Alfred William Alcock in 1894, originally under the genus Congromuraena. It is a marine, deep water-dwelling eel which is known from the Indian Ocean, including the Arabian Sea, the Bay of Bengal, and the Gulf of Aden. It dwells at a depth range of 230–1040 metres.

References

nasicus
Fish described in 1894